Albert Fowles Lindsay (26 September 1881 – 1961) was an English professional footballer who played as a goalkeeper for Sunderland.

References

1881 births
1961 deaths
People from West Hartlepool
Footballers from Hartlepool
English footballers
Association football goalkeepers
Park Villa F.C. players
West Hartlepool F.C. players
Sunderland A.F.C. players
Luton Town F.C. players
Glossop North End A.F.C. players
Sunderland Royal Rovers F.C. players
English Football League players